Portuguesa Fútbol Club, usually known simply as Portuguesa, is a Venezuelan football club based in Acarigua.

History
The club was founded on April 10, 1972, in Acarigua in the northern part of the state of Portuguesa.

Rivalries

Classic Añejo 
The encounter between Portuguesa and Estudiantes de Mérida is one of the most classic and oldest of Venezuelan football. The first match played by these oncenas was May 28, 1972 by Copa Venezuela, and the twin cities leaving a 1–1 draw with Chiazzaro goals at 73 and Cholo Mendoza at the 79th minute, making it the oldest classic in force in the country

Portuguese Derby 

It is that party that led the most important of the Portuguese state: Portuguesa FC and Llaneros de Guanare (Llaneros FC). There is no account with much tray, beginning to dispute in 2001 until the day of today. Both have a fair number of fans in the state.

Titles
Primera División Venezolana: 5
Amateur Era (0):
Professional Era (5): 1973, 1975, 1976, 1977, 1978
Segunda División Venezolana: 1
2006
Segunda División B Venezolana: 0
Tercera División Venezolana: 0
Copa de Venezuela: 3
1973, 1976, 1977

Performance in CONMEBOL competitions
Copa Libertadores: 8 appearances

1974: First round
1975: First round
1976: First round

1977: Semi-finals
1978: First round
1979: First round

1981: First round
1984: First round

Copa Sudamericana: 0 appearances
Recopa Sudamericana: 0 appearances
Copa CONMEBOL: 1 appearance
1997: First round

Manufacturers and sponsors

Installations

Matches stadium 

The José Antonio Páez Stadium is a sports infrastructure built for the practice of football, located in the city of Acarigua in the Portuguese state of the western plains of Venezuela. Despite not being the capital of the region, the building was built in that place by the booming development of this locality llanera; owes its name to the recognized hero of Venezuelan independence and the first president of Venezuela, Jose Antonio Páez.

It is the headquarters of the Portuguese Football Club, currently located in the First Division of Venezuela. Its facilities have the capacity to hold approximately 14 thousand spectators; in 2007 it underwent considerable improvements to be used in the National Plains Sports Games 2007.

The installation was submitted to a new stage of total recovery that consists of 3 stages: the first one was delivered on September 23, 2011, where the total recovery of the engraving, the baths of the popular tribunes were carried out, the construction of a gym for the players, bathrooms showers and dressing rooms for said gymnasium, construction of a transmission house, waterproofed and painted of all the tribunes.

City and sports venue 
Portuguesa FC received award and allocation of grounds for a sports venue.

The Governor of the Portuguese state handed over to the Portuguese Football Club the land where they will build the team's sports headquarters, a project that they would begin to follow next year.

The president of the club five times winner in Venezuelan football, Generoso Mazzocca, showed the project for the construction of this venue.

The Headquarters Deportiva Portuguesa FC would be located in Sector Los Malabares of the city of Araure.

Alternate stadium

Hobbies 
He has a fanaticada like all football teams in Venezuela
The Barra Lanceros Rojinegros are fans of the Portuguesa fc who Sunday to Sunday accompany him in the southern tribune of the Mythical General Stadium Jose Antonio Paez

Current first team squad

Portuguese FC coaches 
 Isidoro 'Pescaito' Rodriguez 1972
 'Walter' Cata 'Roque 1973 -1974
 Vladimir Popovic 1974 - 1975
 Benjamin Fernández 1975 - 1976
 Vladimir Popovic 1976 - 1977
 Celino Mora 1977 - 1978
 Carlos Núñez 1995 - 2002
 Liberio Mora 2006 - 2007
 Celino Mora 2007 - 2008
 Eduardo Contreras 2008 - 2009
 José Luis Jiménez 2009
 Gustavo Valencia 2010
 Johnny Lucena 2010 - 2012
 Carlos Núñez 2012
 Jose Luis Dolgetta 2013
 Stifano Francess 2013 - 2015
 Lenin Bastidas tournament matching 2015
  Renato Renauro 2016
  Horacio Matuszyczk 2016 - 2017
 Carlos Horacio Moreno 2017 - News

Club board and organization chart

Organizational shart 
 President  Generous Mazzocca
 Vice President  Maiker Frías
 Members  Orlando Cárdenas
 Members  Luis Fernández
 Members  Olympia Labrador
 Adviser  Gianni Mazzocca
 General Manager  Raúl Alvárez
 Sports Manager  Johnny Lucena
 Manager of Operations  Rafael Guaricuco

Media and Press || 
Patricia Almao - Media Director
Francisco Miliani - Media Assistant
María Gabriela Almao - Social Networks
Julio Rojas - Photographer
Raiber Jiménez - Graphic Designer

Previous presidents 

  Don Gaetano Costa 1978
  Juan Rondon 2009 - 2010
  Nelson Escobar 2010 - 2014
  Generozo Mazzoca 2014 - News

Means of communication

Media coverage

Fanfare 99.5fm 
The radio that transmits the games of the pentacampeon set of Venezuela

Subsidiaries 
 Portuguesa Fútbol Club B
 Portuguesa Fútbol Club (women) - participate in regional and national tournament
 Portuguese Fs C - team that participates in the Venezuelan Futsal League and Upper Futsal Tournament of Venezuela

References

Much of the content of this article comes from the equivalent Portuguese-language Wikipedia article (retrieved January 16, 2006).

External links 

Official site

Association football clubs established in 1972
Football clubs in Venezuela
Sport in Portuguesa (state)
1972 establishments in Venezuela
Acarigua